The Offley Island Formation is a geologic formation in Washington (state). It preserves fossils dating back to the Silurian period.

See also

 List of fossiliferous stratigraphic units in Washington (state)
 Paleontology in Washington (state)

References
 

Silurian geology of Washington (state)
Silurian northern paleotropical deposits